The Baptist Convention of Sierra Leone is a Baptist Christian denomination in Sierra Leone. It is affiliated with the Baptist World Alliance. The headquarters is in Freetown.

History
The Baptist Convention of Sierra Leone has its origins in a Canadian mission of the preacher David George in 1792 and the support of the Jamaica Baptist Union.  It is officially founded in 1974.  According to a denomination census released in 2020, it claimed 40 churches and 24,000 members.

References

Baptist denominations in Africa
Evangelicalism in Sierra Leone